The Certified Technicians and Technologists Association of Manitoba (CTTAM) is a regulated profession in Manitoba responsible for certifying engineering/applied science technicians and technologists.  The Certified Applied Science Technologists Act assented on June 29, 1998.

CTTAM confers the post-nominal designations of C.Tech. (Certified Technician), and C.E.T. (Certified Engineering Technologist) which are symbols of achievement in engineering/applied science technology and are legally protected for use only by fully certified members in good standing.  The designations are recognized across Canada by many employers and other engineering professionals through the efforts of provincial associations that make up the Technology Professionals Canada (TPC).  The Canadian Council of Technicians and Technologists (CCTT) being a signatory to the International Engineering Alliance (IEA), the Certified Engineering Technicians and Technologists Association of Manitoba recognizes international transferability through the Sydney Accord, the Dublin Accord and the Engineering Technology Mobility Forum, which confers the ability to award the designation IntET (Canada) for Technnologists who wish to work internationally.

The Certified Technicians and Technologists Association of Manitoba, under the name Manitoba Certified Technicians and Technologists (MANCETT), was established in 1965.

Certified Engineering Technologists are bound by a specific code of ethics and rules of professional conduct.

The association is mandated and empowered by the Certified Applied Science Technologists Act of Manitoba

Although certification is voluntary, some employers will require it.

M-License

In 2006, the legislation regarding electrical work changed. Now, all electrical workers must be licensed.

Certified members in the field of Electrical, Instrumentation, Electronic, Communication, Computer, Biomedical and Mechanical can be granted a M-license limited license to practice electrical work, once certain criteria are met.

There are 3 levels of license available: A limited construction license which can be attained after 5400 hours of documented construction work, a maintenance license which can be attained after 3600 hours of documented maintenance work, and a maintenance/builder license.

Activism and lobbying

CTTAM is actively involved with lobbying for the interests of technologists in Manitoba.

CTTAM, in cooperation with the Association of consulting Engineering companies (ACEC), Engineers Geoscientists Manitoba and representatives from the insurance industry, is lobbying to reduce the ultimate limitation period for civil actions in Manitoba.

CTTAM has contributed to local colleges, including Red River College, Assiniboine Community College and University College of the North.

See also
Engineering technologist
Engineering Technology

References

External links
Certified Engineering Technicians and Technologists Association of Manitoba official page
Technology Registrations Canada online application portal

Organizations based in Winnipeg
Professional associations based in Canada